Route 215 or Highway 215 may refer to:

Argentina
 Buenos Aires Provincial Route 215

Canada
 Manitoba Provincial Road 215
 New Brunswick Route 215
 Nova Scotia Route 215
 Prince Edward Island Route 215
 Quebec Route 215

Chile
Route 215-CH in Los Lagos Region

China
 China National Highway 215

Costa Rica
 National Route 215

Ireland
 R215 road (Ireland)

Germany
 Bundesautobahn 215 (A 215)
 Bundesstraße 215 (B 215)

India
 National Highway 215 (India)

United States
 Interstate 215 (California)
 Interstate 215 (Nevada)
 Interstate 215 (Utah)
 Alabama State Route 215
 Arkansas Highway 215
 California State Route 215 (former)
 Clark County 215
 Florida State Road 215 (former)
 Georgia State Route 215
 Iowa Highway 215 (former)
 K-215 (Kansas highway)
 Kentucky Route 215
 Maine State Route 215
 M-215 (Michigan highway) (former)
 Missouri Route 215
 Montana Secondary Highway 215
 New Mexico State Road 215
 New York State Route 215
 North Carolina Highway 215
 Ohio State Route 215
 Oregon Route 215 (former)
 Pennsylvania Route 215
 South Carolina Highway 215
 Tennessee State Route 215
 Texas State Highway 215 (former)
 Texas State Highway Spur 215
 Utah State Route 215 (former)
 Vermont Route 215
 Virginia State Route 215
 Washington State Route 215
 Wyoming Highway 215